Stara Cesta is a settlement in the Municipality of Ljutomer in northeastern Slovenia. The area traditionally belonged to the Styria region and is now included in the Mura Statistical Region.

The local chapel in the centre of the village was built in the late 19th century. It is dedicated to the Sacred Heart of Jesus.

References

External links
Stara Cesta on Geopedia

Populated places in the Municipality of Ljutomer